The members of the 10th General Assembly of Newfoundland were elected in the Newfoundland general election held in November 1869. The general assembly sat from 1870 to 1873.

The Anti-Confederation Party led by Charles Fox Bennett won the election and Bennett served as Newfoundland's premier. The decisive defeat of candidates supporting Confederation put an end to any discussions about union with Canada.

Thomas R. Bennett was chosen as speaker.

Sir Stephen John Hill served as colonial governor of Newfoundland.

Members of the Assembly 
The following members were elected to the assembly in 1869:

Notes:

By-elections 
By-elections were held to replace members for various reasons:

Notes:

References 

Newfoundland
Terms of the General Assembly of Newfoundland and Labrador